The 2014 NAIA Football National Championship was a four round sixteen team tournament played between November 22 through December 19 of 2014.  The tournament concluded on December 19 with a single game played as the 59th Annual Russell Athletic NAIA Football National Championship.  The game matched #8 Southern Oregon (12–2) against #7 Marian (11–2).

The championship game was played at Municipal Stadium in Daytona Beach, Florida.  A total of sixteen teams participated in the single-elimination tournament from across the country.  Placement in the tournament was based on the final edition of the 2014 NAIA Coaches' Poll.  This year's field included all but one of the top 17 teams from the final poll.

This was a new venue for the championship game, which had been contested for the past six years at Barron Stadium in Rome, Georgia.

Tournament bracket

  * denotes OT.

References

NAIA Football National Championship
Southern Oregon Raiders football
Marian Knights football
Events in Daytona Beach, Florida
NAIA Football National Championship
NAIA Football National Championship
NAIA Football National Championship